Peismoceras is a genus of fossil Cephalopoda in the family Lechritrochoceratidae.

These nautiloids were fast-moving nektobenthic carnivores. They lived in the Silurian Period, from Late Wenlock  age (from 428.2 ± 1.5 to 422.9 ± 2.8 mya) to Přídolí  Age (from 418.7 ± 1.5 to 416 ± 2.8 mya).

Species
 Peismoceras amicum (Barrande)† 
 Peismoceras optatum (Barrande)† 
 Peismoceras pulchrum†

References

 Biolib
 Paleobiology Database
Sepkoski, Jack Sepkoski's Online Genus Database

Prehistoric nautiloid genera
Silurian cephalopods